ENJ may refer to:
 Enerjet, a Canadian airline
 Nort Jet, a defunct Spanish airline
 Engelsbergs Norberg Järnvägshistoriska förening, operators of the Engelsberg–Norberg Railway